is a Japanese footballer currently playing as a midfielder for V-Varen Nagasaki.

Club career
After studying at the Maebashi Ikuei High School, Kasayanagi joined V-Varen Nagasaki ahead of the 2022 season.

Career statistics

Club
.

Notes

References

2003 births
Living people
Association football people from Kanagawa Prefecture
Japanese footballers
Japan youth international footballers
Association football midfielders
J2 League players
Yokohama FC players
V-Varen Nagasaki players